Kurt Stettler (11 April 1910 – 1 December 1974) was a Swiss racing cyclist. He rode in the 1934 and 1935 Tour de France.

References

1910 births
1974 deaths
Swiss male cyclists
Place of birth missing